Lorenzo Sabbatini  or Sabatini, Sabattini or Sabadini (c. 1530–1576), sometimes referred to as Lorenzino da Bologna,  was an Italian painter of the Mannerist period from Bologna.

Biography
Sabbatini was born in Bologna and studied with Prospero Fontana, who was his teacher and collaborator, and was a friend of Orazio Samacchini. His style was also influenced by Giorgio Vasari and the Emilian mannerism of Parmigianino.

By 1565 he was working with the studio of Giorgio Vasari in Florence, where was elected member of the Academy.

Between 1566 and 1573 he was in Bologna, where he decorated the walls of several churches, including Santa Maria delle Grazie, Chiesa della Morte, San Martino Maggiore, and San Giacomo Maggiore.

In 1573 he moved to Rome to work under Vasari in the Cappella Paolina (with Federico Zuccari) and Sala Regia of the Vatican, where he adopted many of the stylistic traits of Raphael's school and produced perhaps his most famous painting, The Triumph of Faith over Infidelity. After Vasari's death in 1574, Gregory XIII appointed Sabatini superintendent of works in the Vatican, a post he retained until his own premature death.

Sabbatini died in Rome in 1577. His students included the engraver Giulio di Antonio Bonasone and the painter of Flemish origin, Denis Calvaert.

Works

Holy Family and Saints, San Edigio, Bologna
The Triumph of Faith over Infidelity
Assumption of the Virgin (Pinacoteca Nazionale, Bologna)
Frescoes at the Malvasia Chapel (1566–70, San Giacomo Maggiore, Bologna)
The Four Evangelists
The Four Teachers of the Church (1570)
The Holy Family with Saints John and Michael Archangel (1570, San Giacomo Maggiore), executed in part with Denys Calvaert
Virgin and Child with Saint John (1572), Louvre, Paris

References

Further reading
Baglione, Giovanni Le Vite de’ Pittori, Scultori et Architetti. Dal Pontificato di Gregorio XII del 1572 in fino a’ tempi di Papa Urbano VIII nel 1642, p. 17
Sabbatini, Lorenzo. In: A New General Biographical Dictionary, by Hugh James Rose.

1530 births
1577 deaths
16th-century Italian painters
Italian male painters
Painters from Bologna
Italian Mannerist painters